The War of the Bruces is the second album, released in 2002, by The Bruces.

Background
After nearly eight years had passed from the prior album Hialeah Pink, which Alex McManus spent working with several other indie acts, he released The War of the Bruces. These songs are a culmination of the years he spent as a supporting musician.

Style
The album is primarily guitar driven, but there are instrumental appearances of the banjo, sparse horn sections, and minimal use of keyboards layering the compositions; most are played by McManus, including the fiddle. The lyrics have been described as abstract, and at times metaphorical, and the music as fluid, atmospheric.

Reception

The War of the Bruces received somewhat positive reviews; Tim McMahon stated that "McManus' dust-covered melodies are a road best taken". However, it took one critic several listens in order to enjoy it.
The album appeared on the CMJ music charts on December 2, 2002, at No. 174. After staying on the charts for a total of 4 weeks, The War of the Bruces peaked at No. 151, and departed the charts on December 23, 2002.

Track listing

References

Sources

2002 albums